Heimildin is an Icelandic bi-weekly newspaper known for investigative journalism. It was founded in January 2023 with the merge of Stundin and Kjarninn. The chief editors of the paper are Ingibjörg Dögg Kjartansdóttir and Þórður Snær Júlíusson.

References

External links
 

2023 establishments in Iceland
Publications established in 2023
Newspapers published in Iceland
Icelandic-language newspapers
Icelandic news websites